Harvey Sproston (born 1 April 1871, date of death unknown) was a Guyanese cricketer. He played in four first-class matches for British Guiana from 1894 to 1900.

See also
 List of Guyanese representative cricketers

References

External links
 

1871 births
Year of death missing
Guyanese cricketers
Guyana cricketers